Aaron Verwilst (born 2 May 1997) is a Belgian cyclist, who currently rides for UCI ProTeam .

Major results
2014
 1st Junior Tour of Flanders
 6th Overall Keizer der Juniores
2015
 2nd Junior Tour of Flanders
 2nd Overall Internationale Niedersachsen-Rundfahrt
 7th Overall Trophée Centre Morbihan
 9th Overall GP Général Patton
2017
 2nd Omloop Het Nieuwsblad U23
2019
 5th Paris–Chauny

References

External links

1997 births
Living people
Belgian male cyclists
Cyclists from West Flanders